Love Letters is a 1944 German comedy film directed by Hans H. Zerlett and starring Käthe Haack, Hermann Thimig, and Paul Hubschmid.

The film's sets were designed by the art director Wilhelm Vorwerg.

Cast

References

Bibliography

External links 
 

1944 films
Films of Nazi Germany
German comedy films
1944 comedy films
1940s German-language films
Films directed by Hans H. Zerlett
UFA GmbH films
1940s German films